Kim Jin-young, or Kim Jin-yeong may also refer to:

 Kim Jin-yeong (cyclist) (born 1970), South Korean cyclist
 Kim Jin-young (footballer) (born 1992), South Korean footballer
 Kim Jin-young (actress) (born 2003), South Korean actress